The Jens Larson Jenson Lime Kiln, in Sevier County, Utah near Richfield, Utah, was built in 1903.  It was listed on the National Register of Historic Places in 1978.

It is a lime kiln which was deemed significant as a structureimportant in the development of communities in the Sevier Valley. Built by Jens L. Jenson, Richfield's "well-known" lime burner, the kiln cured lime which was used for mortar utilized in the construction of numerous rock and brick structures, as well as in the production of the whitewash used on structures basic to successful rural life.  Jens Larson "Limeburner" Jenson (sometimes spelled Jensen) was born in Dalby, Scona, Sweden, July 14, 1827. He was baptised into the Church of Jesus Christ of Latter-day Saints in 1855, and arrived in Utah in 1859 as a member of the Rowley Handcart Company. Jenson lived the doctrine of plural marriage, being joined to three women; and later served a sixty-two day sentence for polygamy.

References

		
National Register of Historic Places in Sevier County, Utah
Buildings and structures completed in 1903
Lime kilns in the United States
Commercial buildings on the National Register of Historic Places in Utah